Moe Di (born 16 January 1948) is a Burmese comedian and actor who became famous in kyuntot Thabin Tin Moe Win Drama with comedian Mos. He has acted in more than 80 films and 200 videos.

He won the Best Supporting Actor award at the 2007 Myanmar Academy Award for his performance in the film Koe-Sal-Hsa Thar-Lein-Mal (Ninety Times More Superior).

Early life and careers

Moe Di was born on January 16, 1948, in Hinthada to his father, U Han Tin, and mother, Daw Khin Myint. He is the youngest of three siblings. He studied up to the seventh grade.

Awards and nominations

References 

20th-century Burmese male actors
1948 births
Living people
21st-century Burmese male actors
Burmese male film actors